Carex baccans, the crimson-seeded sedge, is a species of flowering plant in the family Cyperaceae, with a widespread distribution in subtropical and tropical Asia; most of the Indian Subcontinent, southern China, most of Malesia (except Borneo), and on to New Guinea. An endophytic bacteria species, Glycomyces endophyticus, has been isolated from its roots.

References

baccans
Flora of tropical Asia
Flora of South-Central China
Flora of Southeast China
Flora of Hainan
Flora of Taiwan
Plants described in 1834